Baji may refer to:

Baji (clothing), traditional Korean pant 
Baji (food), beaten rice eaten in Nepal
Baji (2015 film), a Marathi-language film
Baji (1963 film), a Pakistani musical romance film
Baji Boxing, or Bājíquán, a Chinese martial art
Balázs Baji (born 1989), Hungarian track and field athlete
Munni Baji (born 1941), Pakistani artist
Baji, Georgia, a village in Georgia

See also
Bajirao I
Bhajji, a spicy Indian snack
Bhaji (disambiguation)
Baji Prabhu Deshpande